Phaqcha Mayu (Quechua phaqcha waterfall, mayu river, "waterfall river", also spelled Pajcha Mayu) is a Bolivian river in the Cochabamba Department, Arani Province, Vacas Municipality, and in the Carrasco Province, Pocona Municipality. It originates near Vacas. From the lake Pilawit'u it flows southeast. Downstream, south of Pocona, it is also known under the  name Ch'akiri.

See also
List of rivers of Bolivia

References

Rivers of Cochabamba Department